Aydınlık is a village in the Mazgirt District, Tunceli Province, Turkey. The village is populated by Kurds of the Izol, Lolan and Şadiyan tribes and had a population of 27 in 2021.

The hamlets of Direkli and Ziyaretderesi are attached to the village.

References 

Villages in Mazgirt District
Kurdish settlements in Tunceli Province